Kevin Waugh  (born June 9, 1956) is a Canadian politician and former television sports journalist. Waugh was first elected to represent the riding of Saskatoon—Grasswood in the House of Commons of Canada in the 2015 Canadian federal election. During the 43rd Canadian Parliament Waugh's private member bill An Act to amend the Criminal Code (sports betting) was adopted to legalize betting on single sport events in Canada.

Broadcasting career 
Prior to his election as an MP, Waugh had been a longtime sportscaster with CTV Saskatoon.

Political career

School Trustee 
From 2006 to 2015, Waugh served as the Ward 9 Trustee for the Saskatoon Public School Division.

Conservative Nomination 
Prior to the 2015 election, Waugh defeated incumbent Member of Parliament and Cabinet Minister Lynne Yelich, who had previously served as the Minister of State for Western Economic Diversification and Minister of State (Foreign Affairs and Consular) in the nomination race for the newly created riding of Saskatoon-Grasswood, which was replacing the former riding of Blackstrap. Waugh stated at the time that "Lynne was a great M.P., I have no issues with her" and that "we haven't had a Saskatoon MP from the city for a long time". Waugh had previously served as President of the Blackstrap Conservative Association while Yelich was the Member of Parliament for the riding.

Member of Parliament 
In the 2015 election, Waugh was elected by a margin of nearly 5,000 votes over his closest opponent, Scott Bell of the New Democratic Party. Following the selection of Rona Ambrose as interim leader of the Conservative Party of Canada, Waugh was appointed as the Deputy Critic for Canadian Heritage. Waugh was also appointed to the House of Commons Standing Committee on Canadian Heritage.

In 2016, at a sports award ceremony, Waugh claimed that female athletes are treated as good or better than their male counterparts. That comment received heavy criticism from female and male athletes alike, and concern given that Waugh's spot on the Canadian parliamentary committee examining women and girls in sport.

On February 26, 2016, Waugh introduced Bill C-241: An Act to amend the Excise Tax Act (school authorities). This legislation would have increased the goods and services tax rebate that schools and school boards received from 68% to 100%, effectively exempting schools from paying the tax.  Despite support from members of his own Conservative Party, the New Democratic Party and the Bloc Québécois,  the bill was defeated at second reading by the Liberal majority.

Upon the election of Andrew Scheer as leader of the Conservative Party in May 2017, Waugh was named Deputy Shadow Minister for Crown-Indigenous Relations and Northern Affairs, Indigenous Services, and the Canadian Northern Economic Development Agency. In this role, Waugh served on the Standing Committee on Indigenous and Northern Affairs.

Waugh was re-elected with an increased vote count and vote share in the 2019 Canadian Federal Election, receiving more than twice as many votes as his closest challenger. On December 4, 2019, Waugh was elected as the Chair of the Conservative Party's Saskatchewan Regional Caucus. This position is responsible for chairing meetings of the regional caucus and presenting the results and decisions of those meetings to party leadership. During the 43rd Canadian Parliament Waugh's private member bill An Act to amend the Criminal Code (sports betting) (Bill C-218) was adopted to allow a province's lottery corporation to offer betting on single sport events, athletic contests, races and fights.

In July 2021, Waugh voted against a bill to ban LGBT conversion therapy. He was one of 62 Conservative MPs to vote against the bill.

#BeLikeBruce
In recognition of his contributions to the community, retired police officer Bruce Gordon was bestowed the Saskatoon-Grasswood Canada 150 Award by Waugh. In addition to his career as a police officer with the Saskatoon Police Service and dedication to the athletic community, Gordon was a volunteer and offered his time to PRIDE Saskatoon, the Saskatoon Road Runners Club, John Lake Home and School Council, the Saskatoon Sexual Assault Centre, and may other local organizations.

Controversies
On February 2, 2022, Waugh posted a picture on his Twitter page  of himself, as well as former Conservative Party leader Andrew Scheer, Battlefords-Lloydminster MP Rosemarie Falk, Moose Jaw-Lake Centre-Lanigan MP Fraser Tolmie, Regina-Lewvan MP Warren Steinley and Sen. Denise Batters standing with the Saskatchewan flag at the Freedom Convoy 2022. The mayor of Ottawa, Jim Watson, is demanding an apology, as he feels the protestors actions are not welcomed and that "MPs and senator in the picture should know better."

Personal life 
Kevin Waugh lives in Saskatoon with his wife Ann, with whom he has two children and one granddaughter.

Electoral record

Federal

Provincial

|-

|- bgcolor="white"
!align="left" colspan=3|Total
!align="right"|8,733
!align="right"|100.00
!align="right"|

Municipal

References

External links

Living people
Conservative Party of Canada MPs
Members of the House of Commons of Canada from Saskatchewan
Politicians from Saskatoon
Saskatchewan school board members
Canadian sports journalists
Year of birth uncertain
21st-century Canadian politicians
1955 births